Andriy Glushchenko (born 23 October 1977) is a Ukrainian triathlete.

Glushchenko competed at the first Olympic triathlon at the 2000 Summer Olympics.  He took eleventh place with a total time of 1:49:30.17. Four years later, at the 2004 Summer Olympics, Glushchenko competed again but was unable to finish the competition. In 1997, Glushchenko won the Junior Men ITU Triathlon World Championships in Perth.

References

Ukrainian male triathletes
Triathletes at the 2000 Summer Olympics
Triathletes at the 2004 Summer Olympics
1977 births
Living people
Olympic triathletes of Ukraine
20th-century Ukrainian people
21st-century Ukrainian people